Possum Dixon is the debut album by the American band Possum Dixon, released in 1993. The first single, "Watch the Girl Destroy Me", was a minor hit. 

The band promoted the album by touring with, among others, the Dead Milkmen and the Violent Femmes. The album had sold more than 31,000 copies by the end of the 1990s.

Production
The album was produced by Earle Mankey and the band; Mankey encouraged Possum Dixon to use older instruments in the studio. Some songs from band's early releases were rerecorded for Possum Dixon. "Nerves" is about low-paying work; "Executive Slacks" about bosses. All of the songs were written by frontman Rob Zabrecky, on his own or with other members of the band.

Critical reception

Trouser Press wrote that though Zabrecky "sometimes takes his twentysomething angst too seriously, 'Nerves' and other numbers do a fair job of capturing what it’s like to be young, poor and alienated in the City of Angels." The Los Angeles Times opined: "Throw skinny ties on these guys and it'd be just a tad too close to new-wave redux," but admired "the propulsive energy" of the album. The Houston Press deemed the album "catchy party rock music with nerdy vocals telling funny stories about girls and other nervous habits."

The Washington Post determined that "songs such as 'In Buildings' and 'She Drives', in which singer, bassist and songwriter Robert Zabrecky tempers his attitude and record-collector erudition with a solid melody and a steady beat, are as rollicking as the work of much dumber bands." The Calgary Herald praised the "punkish energy [and] irreverence." The Indianapolis Star stated that the guitarists shuffle "easily through a diversity of styles—be it ska, surf or just good ol' jangly guitar rock."

Track listing

References

Possum Dixon albums
1993 debut albums
Albums produced by Earle Mankey
Interscope Records albums